LaFayette is the county seat of Chambers County, Alabama, United States,  northwest of Columbus, Georgia. As of the 2010 census, the population of the city was 3,003.

History
Chambers County was formed in 1832. The newly elected county officials opted to locate the county seat as near as possible to the center of the county. Lots for the new town were auctioned in October 1833, with proceeds from the sale financing the construction of a courthouse and jail. The town was first called "Chambersville", but by the time of incorporation on January 7, 1835, the town name had been changed to "Lafayette", named after the Marquis de Lafayette; its spelling was changed to "LaFayette" due to the influence of newspaper editor Johnson J. Hooper, who created a fictional character called Captain Simon Suggs, a backwoods southerner who pronounced the town's name as "La
Fait". The city's newspaper, The LaFayette Sun, was founded under the name The Alabama Standard in April 1841 and adopted its current name on August 3, 1881.

In 1898 John Anderson, a black man, was quickly hanged in LaFayette by a mob for a murder he did not commit.

Scenes from the movie Mississippi Burning were filmed at the Chambers County Courthouse and in downtown LaFayette.

LaFayette is the birthplace of heavyweight boxing champion Joe Louis. An  bronze statue, executed by sculptor Casey Downing Jr. of Mobile, Alabama, was erected in Louis' honor in front of the Chambers County courthouse.
It is also the hometown of Hoyt L. Sherman, one of artist Roy Lichtenstein's principal art professor/mentors at Ohio State University.

Geography
LaFayette is located at 32°53'54.859" North, 85°24'2.822" West (32.898572, -85.400784).

The city is located in east central Alabama along U.S. Route 431, which is the main north–south route through the city. U.S. 431 leads north  to Roanoke and south  to Opelika. Alabama State Route 50 also runs through the city as a southern bypass, leading east  to Lanett on the Alabama-Georgia state line, and southwest  to Camp Hill. Alabama State Route 77 begins in the northern part of the city and connects LaFayette to the town of Wadley,  to the northwest.

Climate
According to the Köppen climate classification, LaFayette has a humid subtropical climate (abbreviated Cfa).

Demographics

2020 census

As of the 2020 United States census, there were 2,684 people, 1,017 households, and 610 families residing in the city.

2010 census
As of the census of 2010, there were 3,003 people, 1,129 households, and 749 families residing in the city. The racial makeup of the city was 68.8% Black or African American, 29.3% White, 0.1% Native American, 0.4% Asian, 0.8% from other races, and 0.7% from two or more races. 1.9% of the population were Hispanic or Latino of any race.

There were 1,129 households, out of which 23.4% had children under the age of 18 living with them, 29.6% were married couples living together, 30.7% had a female householder with no husband present, and 33.7% were non-families. 29.6% of all households were made up of individuals, and 13.2% had someone living alone who was 65 years of age or older. The average household size was 2.43 and the average family size was 2.98.

In the city, the age distribution of the population shows 22.0% under the age of 18, 9.8% from 18 to 24, 23.4% from 25 to 44, 26.8% from 45 to 64, and 18.0% who were 65 years of age or older. The median age was 40.2 years. For every 100 females, there were 87.1 males. For every 100 females age 18 and over, there were 103.5 males.

The median income for a household in the city was $26,319, and the median income for a family was $31,629. Males had a median income of $31,842 versus $27,833 for females. The per capita income for the city was $12,149. About 28.5% of families and 36.2% of the population were below the poverty line, including 43.2% of those under age 18 and 22.9% of those age 65 or over.

Education
The Chambers County School District provides public education for LaFayette. Within the city limits are two high schools (Lafayette High School and the Chambers County Career Technical School), one middle school (JP Powell Middle School), and one elementary school (Eastside Elementary School).

Chambers Academy (grades pre-K through 12) is a private school in LaFayette.

Notable people
 Catharine Webb Barber, attended the Lafayette Female Seminary, at Chambers Court House; afterwards taught in the same institution
 William B. Bowling, U.S. Representative from 1920 to 1928
 Dave Butz, former NFL player
 James R. Dowdell, jurist and the 20th Chief Justice of the Alabama Supreme Court from 1909 to 1914
 Morris Finley, professional basketball player. Graduated from LaFayette High School.
 Hal Finney, former Major League Baseball player
 Lou Finney, former Major League Baseball player
 Perry Griggs, former Baltimore Colts player
 James Thomas "Cotton Tom" Heflin, member of the United States House of Representatives and a leading proponent of white supremacy
 Johnson J. Hooper, author and humorist
 Jay Jacobs, athletic director at Auburn University
 Joe Louis, Heavyweight boxing champion
 Leon Renfroe Meadows, president of East Carolina University from 1934 to 1944
 Arthur W. Mitchell, U.S. Representative from Illinois and first African American to be elected to the United States Congress as a Democrat
 Gertrude Morgan, preacher, missionary, artist, musician, and poet who worked in New Orleans in the 1960s and '70s
 Hoyt L. Sherman, art professor and principal mentor to pop artist Roy Lichtenstein
 Jimmy Stewart, former Major League Baseball player. Graduated from LaFayette High School in 1957.
 James Still, poet, novelist, and folklorist
 Mike Williams, former tight end for the Washington Commanders

Gallery

References

External links
 City of LaFayette official website
 Greater Valley Area Chamber of Commerce

Cities in Alabama
Cities in Chambers County, Alabama
County seats in Alabama
Populated places established in 1833
Lynching deaths in Alabama
1833 establishments in Alabama